The 1986–87 Calgary Flames season was the seventh National Hockey League season in Calgary and 15th for the Flames franchise.  The Flames posted their best record in franchise history to that time, as Calgary's 95 points was the third best total in the league.  The Flames' defence of their 1986 Campbell Conference championship was quickly snuffed out by the Winnipeg Jets, as the Flames were upset in the first round of the playoffs in six games by their Manitoba rivals.

Joe Mullen captured his first Lady Byng Memorial Trophy for gentlemanly conduct, while Al MacInnis was named a Second Team All-star.  The Flames had no player representatives at Rendez-vous '87, which replaced the All-Star Game for this season, though head coach Bob Johnson served as an assistant coach for the NHL all-stars.

Tragedy struck the Flames in the summer of 1986, as their first round draft pick, George Pelawa, died in an automobile crash over the Labour Day weekend.  Pelawa's death is commonly rumoured to be an inspiration for the 1988 Tom Cochrane song "Big League", but has never been confirmed as true.

Following the season, the Flames released a music video to benefit charity. The "Red Hot" video featured many players, including Lanny McDonald, Gary Roberts, Mike Vernon, Al MacInnis and Joel Otto, among others, lipsynching and pretending to play instruments. It was released on VHS and on vinyl. It enjoyed popularity then but was forgotten until the video surfaced on the internet in 2005.

Regular season

Season standings

Schedule and results

Playoffs

Player statistics

Skaters
Note: GP = Games played; G = Goals; A = Assists; Pts = Points; PIM = Penalty minutes

†Denotes player spent time with another team before joining Calgary.  Stats reflect time with the Flames only.
‡Traded mid-season.

Goaltenders
Note: GP = Games played; TOI = Time on ice (minutes); W = Wins; L = Losses; OT = Overtime/shootout losses; GA = Goals against; SO = Shutouts; GAA = Goals against average

Transactions
The Flames were involved in the following transactions during the 1986–87 season.

Trades

Free agents

Draft picks

Calgary's picks at the 1986 NHL Entry Draft, held in Montreal, Quebec.

See also
1986–87 NHL season

References

Player stats: 2006–07 Calgary Flames Media Guide, pg 125
Game log: 2006–07 Calgary Flames Media Guide, pg 141
Team standings:  1986–87 NHL standings @hockeydb.com
Trades: Individual player pages at hockeydb.com

Calgary Flames seasons
Calgary Flames season, 1986-87
Calg